() (also known as  ( or ),  or  for short) and  (钗) are generic term for hairpin in China.  (with the same character of ) is also the term used for hairpins of the Qin dynasty. The earliest form of Chinese hair stick was found in the Neolithic Hemudu culture relics; the hair stick was called ji (笄), and were made from bones, horns, stones, and jade.

Hairpins are an important symbol in Chinese culture, and are associated with many Chinese cultural traditions and customs. They were also used as every day hair ornaments in ancient China; all Chinese women would wear a hairpin, regardless of their social rank. The materials, elaborateness of the hairpin's ornaments, and the design used to make the hairpins were markers of the wearer's social status. Hairpins could be made out of various materials, such as jade, gold, silver, ivory, bronze, bamboo, carved wood, tortoiseshell and bone, as well as others.

Cultural

Burials 
During the Chinese funeral period, women in mourning were not allowed to wear hairpins.

ceremony

 played an important role in the coming-of age of Han Chinese women. Before the age of 15 years old, women did not use hairpins, and always kept their hair in braids. When a woman turned 15, she stopped wearing braids, and a hairpin ceremony called , or "hairpin initiation", would be held to mark the rite of passage. During the ceremony, their hair would be coiled into a bun with a  hairpin. After the ceremony, the woman would be eligible for marriage.

Hairpins as a love token

Betrothal and wedding customs
When engaged to be married, Chinese women would take the hairpin from their hair and give it to their male fiancé. After the wedding, the husband would then return the hairpin to his newly-wed wife by placing it back in her hair.

Separation and reunion love token
The  hairpin also used to be a form of love token; when lovers were forced to break apart, they would often break a hairpin in half, and each would keep half of the hairpin until they were reunited.

Similarly, when married couples were separated for a long period of time, they would break a hairpin in two and each keep one part. If they were to meet again in the future, they would then put the hairpin together again, as a proof of their identity and as a symbol of their reunion.

Design and construction

Materials
Initially, Chinese people liked hairpins which were made out of bone and jade. Hairpins which were made out of carved jade appeared in China as early as the Neolithic Period, along with jade carving technology. Some ancient Chinese hairpins dating from the Shang dynasty can still be found in some museums.

By the Bronze Age, hairpins which were made out of gold had been introduced into China by people living on the country's Northern borders. Some ancient Chinese hairpins dating back to 300 BC were made from bone, horn, wood, and metal.

The art of engraving wood first appeared in the Tang dynasty, and this new form of art was then applied to large wooden Chinese hairpins. Many of these wooden hairpins were then coated with silver.

In the Ming dynasty, the hairpins became more elaborate, and the carvings were made on silver, ivory, and jade, with pearl being used often as a setting.

Decorations
Hairpins could also be decorated with gemstones, as well as designs of flowers, dragons, and phoenixes.

Types 
There are various types of Chinese hairpins:

The  is a type of hairpin with a single pin. The zan could also come in different styles such as:

 -style: A style of  hairpin which likely refers to the hairpin used to secure the hair in a bun.
 -style: A style of  hairpin in the shape of a  scepter.
 Tiger-head style
 Round-dragon style

Phoenix hairpin 
Phoenix (Fenghuang) hairpin originated in Qin dynasty and had an upper part made of gold and silver while the feet was made of tortoise shell; it later evolved into the fengguan during the Song dynasty. The fengguan then continued to evolve further in the Ming and Qing dynasties, and in the modern republic. In the Han dynasty, an imperial edict decreed that the hairpin with fenghuang decorations had to become the formal headpiece for the empress dowager and the imperial grandmother. The fenghuang is an auspicious bird in Chinese tradition and is believed to represent the empress or the bride in a wedding. Phoenix hairpins were also made and used by Peranakan women after settling in the Straits as part of their wedding headdresses.

The  is a type of hairpin with double or multiple pins.

The  was an elaborate and exquisite form of hairpin which denoted noble status. It was generally made of gold and was often decorated with jewels (such as pearls and jade) and carved designs (such as in the shape of dragons or phoenix). "shake as you go" or "that sway with each step" or "step shake"). The  became popular in the Western Han dynasty.

hairpin

Flower-hairpin headdresses 
The Flower-hairpin headdresses is a generic term which was used to refer to the jewellery and headdresses worn by the Song dynasty Empresses and imperial concubines. The Flower-hairpin headdresses were decorated with flower hairpins. Different numbers of flowers were used depending on the imperial consorts' ranks and specific imperial rules were issued on their usage.

The  is a Chinese hairpin worn by women in the Ming dynasty in their hair bun; the upper part of the hairpin was usually in the shape of a Buddhist statue, an immortal, a Sanskrit word, or a phoenix. The Chinese character  ("longevity") could also be used to decorate the hairpin.

See also 
 Hairpin
 Hair stick
 List of Hanfu headwear
  - the Japanese equivalent
  - the Korean equivalent
Fengguan - phoenix crown

References 

Chinese headgear
Confucian culture
East Asian traditions
Fashion accessories
Hairdressing
Rites of passage